East Steubenville is an unincorporated community in Brooke County, West Virginia, United States. It lies across the Ohio River from Steubenville, Ohio. East Steubenville is the site of the East Steubenville Panhandle Archaic Site, discovered by the West Virginia Archaeological Society in 1938. The site consists of the remains of an ancient Native American encampment perched 300 feet above the Ohio River on a ridgetop.

External links 
East Steubenville Archaeological Site
Geomorphology of the East Steubenville Panhandle Archaic Site: Ridgetop Shell Middens

References

Unincorporated communities in Brooke County, West Virginia
Unincorporated communities in West Virginia